Some Lessons: The Bedroom Sessions is the debut EP recorded by American jazz singer-songwriter Melody Gardot. The record is self-released.

Background
After being hit by a car and suffering serious injuries in November 2003, Melody Gardot tried music therapy and learned to play the guitar and write her own songs. This independent EP arose from those sessions in 2005. Not much has been published about the record.

The title song, "Some Lessons", is considered autobiographical, as it contains lines such as It's a miracle that I'm alive (...) To think that I could have fallen / A centimeter to the left / Would not be here to see the sunset / Or have myself a time and Remember the sound of the pavement / World turned upside down. That song, along with "Goodnite", can also be heard on her Worrisome Heart album. The track "Down My Avenue" is partially sung in French.

Track listing
All tracks by Melody Gardot.

"Wicked Ride" – 3:24 	
"Cry Wolf" – 3:45 	
"Down My Avenue" – 4:37 	
"Don't You Worry Baby" – 4:08
"Momma" – 4:18 	
"Some Lessons" – 5:46
"Goodnite" – 3:12 (Hidden track)

References

2005 EPs
Melody Gardot albums